Vieux Grand Port is a town in the Grand Port District of Mauritius. It was the first human settlement in Mauritius.

The Vieux Grand Port Historic Site is a National Heritage site, which contains the ruins of Fort Frederik Henrik, named after Frederik Henrik, Prince of Orange. The Dutch discovered Mauritius in 1598, and built the fort in 1638. The Dutch abandoned Mauritius in 1710, and destroyed the fort. The island was claimed by the French in 1715, who settled in Vieux Grand Port in 1722, but later moved their administration to Port Louis. After 1753 they built on top of the ruins of Fort Frederik Henrik. Today the site is the Frederik Hendrik Museum.

In the 2000 census, the population of Vieux Grand Port was 2,779. In the 2011 census, the population was 2,969.

References

External links

 Frederik Hendrik Museum

Grand Port District